Olivia Alma Charlotta Schough (born 11 March 1991) is a Swedish footballer who plays as a midfielder for Damallsvenskan club FC Rosengård and the Sweden women's national team.

Club career
Schough played for Kopparbergs/Göteborg FC from 2009 to 2013. During that span she won the Svenska Cupen in 2011 and 2012 and the Svenska Supercupen in 2013. She also appeared in the UEFA Women's Champions League in 2011–12 and 2012–13 with Göteborg. In 2013, Göteborg reached the Quarter-finals of the Champions League but were eliminated by Juvisy.

In December 2013 Schough announced her transfer from Göteborg to Bayern Munich. She left Bayern in the summer of 2014 and played for the Russian team WFC Rossiyanka in the fall. In November 2014 she returned to Sweden and signed with Eskilstuna United. In 2015, Eskilstuna finished second in the Damallsvenskan and secured their spot in the Champions League. They defeated Glasgow City in the Round of 32, but were knocked out by Wolfsburg in the Round of 16.

On 5 January 2018, it was announced that Schough was returning to Kopparbergs/Göteborg FC where she had previously played for five years.

After the 2018 season Schough and Göteborg were unable to come to an agreement on a contract extension. Schough then signed with Djurgårdens for the 2019 Damallsvenskan season.

International career
As an under-19 international she played the 2009 U-19 European Championship, where Sweden won a silver, and the 2010 U-20 World Cup.

Schough was called into the senior national team by coach Pia Sundhage for the 2013 Algarve Cup. She made her debut at the tournament in a 1–1 draw with China. Sundhage also selected Schough for UEFA Women's Euro 2013, which Sweden hosted.

In May 2015, Schough and Eskilstuna teammates Malin Diaz and Sara Thunebro were named in Sundhage's Sweden squad for the 2015 FIFA Women's World Cup in Canada.

Schough was named to Sweden's roster for the 2016 Summer Olympics, she appeared in all six games for Sweden, winning the silver medal.

In June 2017, Schough was named Sweden's squad for the UEFA Women's Euro 2017. She played in three matches for Sweden, who were eliminated by the Netherlands in the Quarterfinals.

Career statistics

International

Scores and results list Sweden's goal tally first, score column indicates score after each Schough goal.

Matches and goals scored at World Cup & Olympic tournaments

Matches and goals scored at European Championship tournaments

Honours
Kopparbergs/Göteborg FC
 Svenska Cupen: 2011, 2012
 Svenska Supercupen: 2013

Sweden
 Summer Olympic Games: Silver Medal 2016

References

Match reports

External links

 
 
  (archive)
  (archive)
 Olivia Schough at DFB 
 

1991 births
Living people
Swedish women's footballers
Sweden women's international footballers
BK Häcken FF players
Eskilstuna United DFF players
Damallsvenskan players
Expatriate women's footballers in Germany
Expatriate women's footballers in Russia
Swedish expatriate sportspeople in Germany
Swedish expatriate sportspeople in Russia
Swedish expatriate women's footballers
FC Bayern Munich (women) players
WFC Rossiyanka players
Russian Women's Football Championship players
2015 FIFA Women's World Cup players
Footballers at the 2016 Summer Olympics
Olympic footballers of Sweden
People from Halland
Women's association football midfielders
Medalists at the 2016 Summer Olympics
Olympic silver medalists for Sweden
Olympic medalists in football
2019 FIFA Women's World Cup players
Djurgårdens IF Fotboll (women) players
Footballers at the 2020 Summer Olympics
Medalists at the 2020 Summer Olympics
UEFA Women's Euro 2022 players
UEFA Women's Euro 2017 players
FIFA Century Club